Raymond Huston "Ray" Kennedy Jr. (January 6, 1957 – May 28, 2015) was an American jazz pianist, composer, and arranger. He was a member of John Pizzarelli's trio for more than a decade and recorded more than 10 albums under his own name.

Life and career
Kennedy was born and grew up in Maplewood, Missouri, in 1957. His father was a bandleader, trumpeter and vocalist in the 1930s and 1940s in St. Louis. His mother worked in the Maplewood music store that his parents owned. Kennedy had two siblings: Tom, who became a bassist; and Wanda, who also became a musician. With his brother, he formed The Ray Kennedy Trio at the age of 13, and they played together, including with their sister as vocalist, for five years. According to a biographer of Ruby Braff, Ray and his brother made a recording together in 1972.

Kennedy moved to New York City in his early twenties. He was pianist and arranger for the John Pizzarelli Trio for almost 13 years, after joining in 1993. With the John Pizzarelli Trio, Kennedy played with the New York Pops and Boston Pops orchestras, played for Broadway and off-Broadway productions, and toured internationally. Kennedy first recorded with Pizzarelli in 1994, after making two recordings for Randy Sandke. In 1997 he was part of the cast for the musical Dream. In 2003 he recorded a piano duo album with Dick Hyman.

Around 2005, Kennedy, according to John Pizzarelli, "began expressing a desire to get off the road and spend more time with his family". Kennedy developed multiple sclerosis symptoms in 2006. His career had ended by 2013, and he was living in a nursing home.
Kennedy died at Mount Sinai Hospital, New York City, on May 28, 2015. He was survived by his wife, Eve Langner, and two daughters, Lauren and Brielle.

Playing style
"Kennedy was known for his finger technique and his ability to swing and improvise versions of well-known jazz works."

Discography
An asterisk (*) indicates that the year is that of release.

As leader/co-leader

As sideman

References

Bibliography

 

1957 births
2015 deaths
American jazz pianists
American male pianists
20th-century American pianists
20th-century American male musicians
American male jazz musicians